Sedan Crater is the result of the Sedan nuclear test and is located within the Nevada Test Site,  southwest of Groom Lake, Nevada (Area 51). The crater was listed on the National Register of Historic Places on March 21, 1994.

Over 10,000 people per year visit the crater through free monthly tours offered by the U.S. Department of Energy, National Nuclear Security Administration Nevada Site Office (although its website now states it’s permanently closed). Its closest Soviet counterpart is the slightly wider Chagan crater which filled in to create Lake Chagan.

History and description 

The  crater was created on July 6, 1962 by a  thermonuclear explosion. The explosion created fallout that affected more US residents than any other nuclear test, exposing more than 13 million people to radiation. Within 7 months of the excavation, the bottom of the crater could be safely walked upon with no protective clothing and photographs were taken.

Russian thistle, also known as tumbleweed, is the primary plant species growing in the crater along with some grasses. Analysis in 1993 observed that the original perennial shrubs once living there had shown no recovery.

Statistics 

 Maximum depth
 Maximum diameter
 Volume
 Weight of material lifted
 Maximum lip height
 Minimum lip height

See also
 Barringer crater

References

External links

 Sedan Nuclear Test- Original Military Film - YouTube
 Nevada National Security Site History - Sedan Crater (PDF) 
 The Nuclear Sedan Crater of Nevada
 All Around Nevada - Sedan Crater, {7} reference replacement link

Explosion craters
Nuclear history of the United States
Peaceful nuclear explosions
Tourist attractions in Nye County, Nevada
National Register of Historic Places in Nye County, Nevada